"Pickin' Up Pieces" is the lead single from Brenda K. Starr's debut album, I Want Your Love, released in 1985 by Mirage Records. The song was produced by Arthur Baker, who co-wrote it with Lotti Golden.
The single, released in 1985, was a sizable hit on the Dance/Club Songs chart. It reached a peak of #9 on that chart the same year, and also managed to chart on the R&B chart at the time - reaching a peak of #83.

The single was an early Freestyle release - marked with syncopated rhythms and intense synthetic production. Lyrically, the song is about "Picking up the pieces" and moving on after a failed relationship.

References

1985 songs
1985 singles
Brenda K. Starr songs
Songs written by Arthur Baker (musician)
Songs written by Lotti Golden
Mirage Records singles
Atlantic Records singles